Katelyn Michelle Ohashi (born April 12, 1997) is an American former artistic gymnast who competed for the University of California, Los Angeles. She is a six-time All-American and was a four-time member of USA Gymnastics' Junior National Team, the 2011 junior national champion and the winner of the 2013 American Cup. She trended globally on various social media networks in January 2019 for her perfect 10 score at the 2019 Collegiate Challenge, the fourth perfect 10 floor routine of her career. Ohashi incorporated current, popular dance elements into her floor routines.

Early life and education
Ohashi was born in Seattle, Washington to Richard and Diana Ohashi, the latter a former high-school gymnast. She has three older brothers, Ryan, Kyle and Kalen, and is of German and Japanese descent.

Ohashi started gymnastics at age 3. In 2006, Ohashi, her mother, and the youngest of her brothers, Kalen, moved to Kansas City, Missouri.  Three years later they moved to Plano, Texas, both to support her gymnastics training.

She attended Spring Creek Academy before graduating from Plano Senior High School in 2015. She began attending the University of California, Los Angeles in the fall of 2015, where she majored in gender studies, graduating in 2019. 

Ohashi had body-image problems and has been a recipient of body-shaming insults. She has received mental health counseling, which she reports as being "crucial in my growing as a person and my mental health."

Gymnastics career

Junior

2009 
Early in her career, Ohashi trained with USLA at Great American Gymnastics Express (GAGE) in Blue Springs, Missouri. Ohashi was twelve years old when she made her debut on the national gymnastics scene at the 2009 Junior Olympic National Championships, where she placed first on floor exercise, tied for second on uneven bars, placed fourth in the all-around and tied for seventh on vault.

She competed in her first elite meet at the 2009 U.S. Classic in Des Moines, Iowa, where she placed fourth on floor in the junior division, tied for fifth on balance beam and placed ninth in the all-around. This qualified her for the National Championships in Dallas, where she won the silver medal on floor, placed sixth on beam, finished tenth in the all-around and was named to the junior national team.

Soon after Nationals, Ohashi moved to Plano, Texas, to train at WOGA.

2010 
In the junior division of the 2010 U.S. Classic in Chicago, Ohashi won silver medals in the all-around and on bars, beam and floor. At the National Championships in Hartford, Connecticut, in July, she won the bars title, placed third in the all-around and tied for fourth on floor. She placed fifth on beam and seventh on vault.

At the 2010 Bumbo Cup in Pretoria, South Africa, Ohashi captured the junior-division gold medals in the all-around, floor and vault, along with silver medals on bars and beam.

2011 
In the junior division at the 2011 City of Jesolo Trophy, Ohashi helped the U.S. win the team competition and won an individual gold medal on floor. She tied for second on uneven bars and placed third all-around, fourth on beam and fifth on vault.

At the U.S. Classic in Chicago, she won the silver medal on beam with a score of 14.95, and tied for fifth on vault with Kiana Winston (14.55). At the National Championships in August, she won the junior all-around title with a total score of 120.95 over two nights, beating defending champion Kyla Ross.

Ohashi captured the bars title at Nationals with skills that included an el-grip endo to straddled Jaeger, a Gienger and a tucked double-double dismount. Her winning beam routine, one of the most difficult in the world, featured a full-twisting back layout, a standing Arabian, an Onodi and a piked full-in dismount. She also won floor with a routine that included a piked full-in and a two-and-a-half twist to front full. On vault, she performed a double-twisting Yurchenko and finished fourth.

Senior 
Ohashi won the 2013 American Cup in March, defeating U.S. teammate Simone Biles. In April, however, she had shoulder surgery, which prevented her from competing for the rest of the year.

In an interview at the 2014 WOGA Classic, Ohashi said she was unsure of her ability to continue at the international elite level after her injury. Later in the year, she suffered from two torn shoulders and a spine injury that required surgery, and did not compete again until 2015

Level 10 
In 2015, Ohashi dropped from elite competition back to Level 10. Her first competition since 2013 was the Texas Prime Meet, where she performed only on vault, beam and floor.

Ohashi competed at the 2015 Pikes Peak Cup in Colorado Springs on February 6. She placed 17th in the all-around competing on three events instead of four, and finished second in the vault event final with a score of 9.850. She then competed at the 2015 WOGA Classic on February 14 and placed 14th overall, competing in only three events. On February 20, she competed at the Legends Invitational in Los Angeles, where she placed 13th in the all-around and second on vault.

Collegiate 

Ohashi joined the UCLA Bruins gymnastics team for the 2015–2016 season and was the Pac-12 Freshman of the Week four times. However, in a meet against the Arizona Wildcats, the cap of Ohashi's balance beam fell off, causing her to land on her neck upon dismount. Tests showed that she had sustained a sternal fracture, an injury that kept her out for four weeks. The following season, Ohashi finished the regular season at No. 1 on balance beam and received two perfect 10s. In the 2018 season she improved upon her performances from the previous season. She captured three perfect 10s on floor, the first of her career, and set career highs on the uneven bars, vault and the all-around. She finished the regular season ranked first on floor and third on beam, and was named the PAC-12 specialist of the year. Going into the national championships she competed on beam and floor, placing fourth on beam and winning the floor title, her first national championship win. She followed this up with another national championship win the next night with the UCLA team in the Super Six, where Ohashi scored a pair of 9.95s on beam and floor. At the 2019 Collegiate Challenge, she earned perfect 10s for a floor routine to an R&B and pop hits medley that she was performing for the second time and that has been shared widely on social media.

Career perfect 10.0

Regular season ranking

2020
In September 2020, a television commercial was launched to promote the Toyota GR Yaris, starring Ohashi and the song Out of the Sky by Canadian band Random Recipe . In the advert, Ohashi is seen performing a plethera of cartwheels, spins and somersaults down Riebeek Street in Cape Town. She then leaps into the air before coming back down as a Yaris.

2021
In 2021, Katelyn Ohashi participated in Simone Biles' "Gold Over America Tour".

Competitive history

References

External links
Katelyn Ohashi - 10.0 on Floor Exercise (1-12-19)
Katelyn Ohashi interview on Good Morning America

1997 births
American female artistic gymnasts
American people of German descent
American sportspeople of Japanese descent
Gymnasts from Texas
Living people
Sportspeople from Seattle
U.S. women's national team gymnasts
UCLA Bruins women's gymnasts
NCAA gymnasts who have scored a perfect 10
People_from_Plano,_Texas
Sportspeople_from_Plano,_Texas
Sportspeople_from_Texas